Valarie Zeithaml is a marketing professor and author. She is the David S. Van Pelt Family Distinguished Professor of Marketing at Kenan-Flagler Business School, University of North Carolina at Chapel Hill. Zeithml is an expert in the area of services marketing and service quality. In the 1980s Zeithaml and her co-authors developed SERVQUAL, a quality management framework for services. She was named a Thomson Reuters Highly Cited Researcher in the report on "The World's Most Influential Scientific Minds."

Selected publications

Books

References

External links
 UNC profile

Living people
American business theorists
American marketing people
Marketing theorists
Marketing people
University of North Carolina at Chapel Hill faculty
Fellows of the American Marketing Association
Year of birth missing (living people)
Place of birth missing (living people)